Hjørring Municipality is a municipality (Danish: kommune) in North Jutland Region on the west coast of the island of Vendsyssel-Thy at the top of the Jutland peninsula in northern Denmark. Its current mayor is Arne Boelt, a member of the Social Democrats (Socialdemokraterne) political party.

The main town and the site of its municipal council is the town of Hjørring. Other towns in the municipality includes the harbour town of Hirtshals to the north, sea side resorts Løkken and Lønstrup to the west, Tårs and Vrå to the south and Sindal and Bindslev to the East.

On January 1, 2007 Hjørring municipality was, as the result of Kommunalreformen ("The Municipal Reform" of 2007), merged with existing Hirtshals, Løkken-Vrå, and Sindal municipalities to form an enlarged Hjørring municipality.

The town of Hjørring

The town of Hjørring is the largest town in Vendsyssel and has a population of 24,789 (2004). It is one of Denmark's oldest towns, and it celebrated its 750-year anniversary as a market town in 1993.

Archaeological discoveries show that the area was already populated 10,000 years ago.

A major fire burned down much of the town in 1819.

There are good educational opportunities in the town including a gymnasium (the Danish equivalent of a high school/pre college), a business gymnasium and a nursing school.

Politics

Municipal council
Hjørring's municipal council consists of 31 members, elected every four years.

Below are the municipal councils elected since the Municipal Reform of 2007.

See also 
 Rubjerg Knude lighthouse

References

External links 

 Municipality's official website
 Municipal statistics: NetBorger Kommunefakta, delivered from KMD aka Kommunedata (Municipal Data)
 Municipal mergers and neighbors: Eniro new municipalities map

Hjørring Municipality
Municipalities of the North Jutland Region
Municipalities of Denmark
Populated places established in 2007